Ethel Mary Doidge (1887–1965) was a British born, South African mycologist and bacteriologist.

Doidge was born in Nottingham, England on 31 May 1887 and was educated in South Africa at Epworth School in Pietermaritzburg and Huguenot College, Wellington, Western Cape. In 1908 she joined the Transvaal Department of Agriculture as an assistant to Dr I.B. Pole Evans.  In 1909 she was awarded a M.A. degree by the University of the Cape of Good Hope, and in 1914 she was awarded a D. Sc. degree; she was the first woman to obtain a doctorate in South Africa. Her thesis was entitled A bacterial disease of mango, Bacillus mangiferae n. sp.. This disease was previously unknown outside South Africa and caused considerable loss to mango growers there for some years. In 1912 she was elected a Fellow of the Linnean Society (F.L.S). She was appointed assistant chief of the Division of Botany and Plant Pathology in 1919 and became principal plant pathologist in 1929, a position she held until her retirement in 1942.  Her services were retained for a further four years, during which time she completed her work on The South African fungi and lichens.

Through her knowledge of bacteriology and mycology, she managed to solve problems of importance to agriculture. Doidge was appointed a member of the first council of the University of South Africa. She was a founding member of the South African Biological Society and in 1922 was given the Society's major award, the Senior Captain Scott Memorial Medal, for her research on South African plant pathology.

Publications

See also 
 List of mycologists
 List of South African plant botanical authors
 Timeline of women in science

Notes and references

Further reading

External links 

 A Google Books bibliography

1887 births
1965 deaths
20th-century South African botanists
South African women botanists
South African mycologists
South African naturalists
20th-century South African women scientists
20th-century naturalists
Fellows of the Linnean Society of London
British emigrants to the Colony of Natal